Amit Sial (born 1 July 1975) is an Indian actor who primarily works in Hindi cinema. He has also worked in various series like Maharani, Jamtara - Sabka Number Ayega, Kathmandu Connection and Inside Edge.

Early and personal life

He moved to Mumbai to pursue a career in Bollywood in 2004.

He appeared in Love Sex aur Dhokha and Maharani.

Acting career

He appeared in Charlie Ke Chakkar Mein, which he co-wrote and co-produced. His other recent acting includes ISSAQ, a Hindi adaptation of Romeo and Juliet, shot in Varanasi, in which the equivalent of Mercutio, and Coffin Maker, set in Goa with Naseeruddin Shah, Ratna Pathak Shah, and Randeep Hooda. Sial worked for Indian producer Ekta Kapoor and Bejoy Nambiar's film Kuku Mathur Ki Jhand Ho Gayi.

Filmography

Films

Television

References

External links

 
 

Living people
Indian male film actors
People from Kanpur
Male actors in Hindi cinema
1975 births